Philip John Gee (born 19 December 1964) is an English former professional footballer who played as a forward from 1984 to 1998.

Playing career
Gee played in the Premier League for Leicester City, scoring the goal to earn them their first ever Premier League point in a 1–1 draw against QPR. He also played in the Football League for Derby County and Plymouth Argyle, before finishing his career in Non-league with Hednesford Town and Shepshed Dynamo.

References
Since 1888... The Searchable Premiership and Football League Player Database (subscription required)
Gresley Rovers Player Database

External links

1964 births
Living people
People from Pelsall
English footballers
Association football forwards
Gresley F.C. players
Derby County F.C. players
Leicester City F.C. players
Plymouth Argyle F.C. players
Hednesford Town F.C. players
Shepshed Dynamo F.C. players
Premier League players
English Football League players
Southern Football League players
House painters